Plutonium hexafluoride is the highest fluoride of plutonium, and is of interest for laser enrichment of plutonium, in particular for the production of pure plutonium-239 from irradiated uranium.  This pure plutonium is needed to avoid premature ignition of low-mass nuclear weapon designs by neutrons produced by spontaneous fission of plutonium-240.

Preparation 
It is prepared by fluorination of plutonium tetrafluoride (PuF4) by powerful fluorinating agents such as elemental fluorine.
 +  → 

This reaction is endothermic. The product forms relatively quickly at temperatures of 750 °C, and high yields may be obtained by quickly condensing the product and removing it from equilibrium.

It can also be obtained by fluorination of plutonium(III) fluoride or plutonium(IV) oxide.

2  + 3  → 2 

 + 3  →  + 

In 1984, the synthesis of plutonium hexafluoride was achieved at unprecedented low temperatures through the use of dioxygen difluoride. Previous techniques needed temperatures so high that the plutonium hexafluoride produced would decompose rapidly. Hydrogen fluoride is not sufficient even though it is a powerful fluorinating agent. Room temperature syntheses are also possible by using krypton difluoride or irradiation with UV light.

Properties

Physical properties 
Plutonium hexafluoride is a red-brown volatile crystalline solid; the heat of sublimation is 12.1 kcal/mol and the heat of vaporization 7.4 kcal/mol. It crystallizes in the orthorhombic crystal system. As a gas, the molecule has octahedral symmetry (point group Oh)

Chemical properties 
Plutonium hexafluoride is relatively hard to handle, being very corrosive and prone to auto-radiolysis.

Reactions with other compounds 
PuF6 is stable in dry air, but reacts vigorously with water, including atmospheric moisture, to form plutonium(VI) oxyfluoride and hydrofluoric acid.

 + 2  →  + 4 

It can be stored for a long time in a quartz or pyrex ampoule, provided there are no traces of moisture, the glass has been thoroughly outgassed, and any traces of hydrogen fluoride have been removed from the compound.

A significant reaction of PuF6 is the reduction to plutonium dioxide. Carbon monoxide generated from an oxygen-methane flame is an example of a good reducing agent for producing actinide oxides directly from the hexafluorides.

Decomposition reactions 
Plutonium hexafluoride decomposes to plutonium tetrafluoride and fluorine gas.

 It can undergo thermal decomposition, which does not occur at room temperature but proceeds very quickly at 280 °C.
 Another possibility is auto-radiolysis, that is decomposing due to its own radioactivity. Emitted alpha particles moving through the crystal lattice cause bonds to be broken, leading to decomposition to lower fluorides and fluorine gas. The decomposition rate through alpha radiation is 1.5% per day on average in the solid phase, but is significantly smaller in the gas phase. It also decomposes from gamma radiation.
 Under laser irradiation at a wavelength of less than 520 nm, it decomposes to plutonium pentafluoride and fluorine; after more irradiation it decomposes further to plutonium tetrafluoride.

Uses 
Plutonium hexafluoride plays a role in the enrichment of plutonium, in particular for the isolation of the fissile isotope 239Pu from irradiated uranium. For use in nuclear weaponry, the 241Pu present must be removed for two reasons:

 It generates enough neutrons by spontaneous fission to cause an uncontrollable reaction.
 It undergoes beta decay to form 241Am, leading to the accumulation of americium over long periods of storage which must be removed.

The separation of plutonium and the americium contained proceeds through a reaction with dioxygen difluoride. PuF4 that has been stored for a long time is fluorinated at room temperature to gaseous PuF6, which is separated and reduced back to PuF4, whereas any AmF4 present does not undergo the same conversion. The product thus contains very little amounts of americium, which becomes concentrated in the unreacted solid.

The separation of the hexafluorides of uranium and plutonium is important in the reprocessing of nuclear waste. From a molten salt mixture containing both elements, uranium can largely be removed by fluorination to UF6, which is stable at higher temperatures, with only small amounts of plutonium escaping as PuF6.

References 

Plutonium compounds
Hexafluorides
Octahedral compounds
Actinide halides
Nuclear materials